Lukáš Jarolím (born 29 July 1976 in Pardubice) is a retired Czech football player.

Personal life
He is the son of Karel Jarolím (former Slavia Prague manager and former international player), brother of David Jarolím and cousin of Marek Jarolím.

He was born in Pardubice where his father played for their local club.

Football career
He started his career at youth ranks of Slavia Prague, where his father was playing for the first team. He then followed his father to join the French clubs, and then back to Slavia Prague in 1990.

He was loaned to FC Union Cheb and Dynamo České Budějovice for the 1996–97 season.

He played his last game for Slavia Prague at the start of the season, and then moved to Marila Příbram.

He played for Marila Příbram until January 2003; then  he joined French Ligue 1 club Sedan. He followed to club to Ligue 2 and played the first half of the 2003–04 season, and then moved again to 2. Fußball-Bundesliga, playing for Greuther Fürth.

He moved back to Gambrinus Liga to Slovácko, before he rejoined Slavia Prague in 2005; both clubs were coached by his father. He played for the club for two more seasons, also becoming team captain, before moving to Siena on free transfer in 2007, on a two-year contract.

He joined Slavia once more in 2010 and became club captain in 2011 following the departure of Karol Kisel.

References

External links
 
 
 

1976 births
Living people
Czech footballers
Czech Republic youth international footballers
Czech Republic under-21 international footballers
FC Rouen players
SK Slavia Prague players
CS Sedan Ardennes players
SpVgg Greuther Fürth players
2. Bundesliga players
A.C.N. Siena 1904 players
Ligue 1 players
Czech First League players
Serie A players
Czech expatriate footballers
Expatriate footballers in Germany
Expatriate footballers in Italy
Expatriate footballers in France
Association football midfielders
FK Mladá Boleslav players
SK Dynamo České Budějovice players
1. FC Slovácko players
1. FK Příbram players
Sportspeople from Pardubice